The 1976–77 FIBA European Cup Winners' Cup was the eleventh edition of FIBA's 2nd-tier level European-wide professional club basketball competition, contested between national domestic cup champions, running from 20 October 1976, to 29 March 1977. It was contested by 25 teams, five more than in the previous edition.

The Italian League became the first league to win the competition twice in a row, for a second time, when Birra Forst Cantù defeated Radnički Belgrade, in the final, held in Palma de Mallorca. Cantù had previously defeated defending champions Cinzano Milano, in the semifinals, in the competition's third tie between two clubs from the same country. Cantù was the fourth Italian club to win the FIBA Cup Winners' Cup, after Ignis Varese, Fides Napoli, and Olimpia Milano.

Participants

First round

|}

*Partizani Tirana withdrew before the first leg, and Radnički Belgrade received a forfeit (2-0) in both games.

Second round

|}

Automatically qualified to the Quarter finals group stage
 Cinzano Milano (title holder)
 Spartak Leningrad

Quarterfinals

Semifinals

|}

Final
March 29, Palau Municipal d'Esports Son Moix, Palma de Mallorca

|}

References

External links 
FIBA European Cup Winner's Cup 1976–77 linguasport.com
FIBA European Cup Winner's Cup 1976–77

Cup
FIBA Saporta Cup